Peter Ijeh (born 28 March 1977) is a Nigerian former professional footballer who played as a forward.

Career

Early career
After playing for clubs like NiTel United Lagos and won the highest goal scorer award with Julius Berger FC in the Nigerian Premier League,he joined Swedish club Malmö FF in 2001. He was the top scorer in Allsvenskan in 2002 with 24 goals. In 2003, he suffered a leg injury that kept him out of most of the season, but he still managed to come back strongly and finished with 10 goals.

In late 2003, he transferred to IFK Göteborg on a free transfer in a highly controversial affair as the club's big name signing for its 100th anniversary and Göteborg finished third.

In 2005 Ijeh moved to Danish club FC Copenhagen and won the league title in 2005–06 season.

Viking

On 19 June 2006, Ijeh moved to Viking FK in Norway on a 3 million Danish krone deal. He became an instant success, scoring 11 goals in 15 games to save the team from relegation. In the last game of the 2006 season Ijeh scored 4 goals and pressured an opposition defender to concede an own goal as Viking surprisingly demolished local rivals and second-placed S.K. Brann 5–0 to climb two places in the table and thus escape relegation on goal difference.

In early January 2007, several sources within Norwegian football claimed that Ijeh would soon be looking for another club, with English Championship side Coventry City courting the Nigerian striker, who was thought to be keen to test his skills in the more physical English game. Coventry City manager Micky Adams was thought to have watched the player on a recent scouting trip to Norway.

Oslo-based club Lyn Fotball reportedly made a NOK 12 million bid for Ijeh's services, though this was rejected from Viking. Ijeh left Viking at the end of the 2009 season to sign for Syrianska FC in the Swedish second division.

Syrianska FC
On 23 October Ijeh scored two goals in the game that took Syrianska to Allsvenskan for the first time ever. He finished the season with 17 goals. He also scored Syrianska FC's first Allsvenskan goal, after a mistake by the Gefle IF defence allowed him to roll the ball into an empty net.

GAIS
After two seasons in Syrianska, Ijeh left the club for Allsvenskan rivals GAIS where he took over the number nine shirt.

Post-playing career
Ijeh studied at Gothenburg University and the Swedish Football Federation (SvFF) and acquired a UEFA advanced licensed certificate. He is also a technical and tactical soccer coach.

Ijeh took over Assyriska BK in November 2013 as a head coach.

On 10 November 2020, it was announced that Ijeh would take over as manager for Division 2 club Vårgårda IK in Västergötland, Sweden.

On 7 June 2022, the club announced that Ijeh would leave his post as manager.

Personal life
Ijeh is a member of the Norwegian Christian sports organization Kristen Idrettskontakt (KRIK).

Career statistics

References

External links

Viking F.K. profile 

Profile at Syrianskafc.com 

1977 births
Living people
Nigerian footballers
Nigeria international footballers
Malmö FF players
IFK Göteborg players
F.C. Copenhagen players
Viking FK players
Syrianska FC players
GAIS players
Association football forwards
Nigerian expatriate footballers
Expatriate footballers in Sweden
Nigerian expatriate sportspeople in Sweden
Expatriate men's footballers in Denmark
Nigerian expatriate sportspeople in Denmark
Expatriate footballers in Norway
Nigerian expatriate sportspeople in Norway
Eliteserien players
Danish Superliga players
Allsvenskan players
Superettan players